The 1971 Australian Sports Car Championship was a CAMS sanctioned Australian motor racing title for drivers of Group A Sports Cars, Group B Improved Production Sports Cars and Group D Series Production Sports Cars. The title, which was the third Australian Sports Car Championship, was won by John Harvey driving a McLaren M6 Repco.

Schedule
The championship was contested over a four heat series.

Points system
Championship points were awarded on a 9-6-4-3-2-1 basis to the first six placegetters at each heat.

Championship standings

Notes and references

Further reading
 Harvey Captures Sports Car Title, The Advertiser, Monday, 15 November 1971, page 22

External links
 1971 Australian sports car racing images, www.autopics.com.au

Australian Sports Car Championship
Sports Car Championship